Capture & Release was the third album by the drone metal band Khanate. It was released in 2005 and is on the independent label Hydra Head.

The album contains only two tracks, "Capture" and "Release", both of which provide the album its name. The music can be described as booming and droning, accompanied by screaming vocals and occasional percussion.

Track listing

References

2005 albums
Hydra Head Records albums
Khanate (band) albums
Albums produced by James Plotkin